Hermann Wülfing Lüer (1836–1910) was a German instrument maker seated in Paris, who patented the Luer taper, which is named after the Lüer family.

References

1910 deaths
1836 births